The Second Chōshū expedition (Japanese: 第二次長州征討), also called the Summer War, was a punitive expedition led by the Tokugawa shogunate against the Chōshū Domain. It followed the First Chōshū expedition of 1864.

Background
The Second Chōshū expedition was announced on 6 March 1865. The operation started on 7 June 1866 with the bombardment of Suō-Ōshima in Yamaguchi Prefecture by the Navy of the Bakufu.

The expedition ended in military disaster for the shogunate troops, as Chōshū forces were modernized and organised effectively. By contrast, the shogunate army was composed of antiquated feudal forces from the Bakufu and numerous neighbouring domains, with only small elements of modernised units. Many domains put up only half-hearted efforts, and several outright refused shogunate orders to attack, notably Satsuma who had by this point entered into an alliance with Chōshū.

Tokugawa Yoshinobu, the new shōgun, managed to negotiate a ceasefire after the death of the previous shōgun, but the defeat fatally weakened the shogunate's prestige. Tokugawa military prowess was revealed to be a paper tiger, and it became apparent that the shogunate could no longer impose its will upon the domains. The disastrous campaign is often seen to have sealed the fate of the Tokugawa shogunate.

The defeat stimulated the Bakufu in making numerous reforms to modernize its administration and army. Yoshinobu's younger brother Ashitake was sent to the 1867 Paris Exposition, Western dress replaced Japanese dress at the shogunal court, and collaboration with the French was reinforced leading to the 1867 French military mission to Japan.

Gallery

See also 

 First Chōshū expedition
 Bakumatsu

Notes

References
 Jansen, Marius B. (2000). The Making of Modern Japan. Cambridge: Harvard University Press. ;  OCLC 44090600
 Totman, Conrad. (1980). The Collapse of the Tokugawa Bakufu, 1862–1868. Honolulu: University of Hawaii Press. OCLC 5495030

Conflicts in 1866
Wars involving Japan
Punitive expeditions of Japan
June 1866 events
1866 in Japan